Amor sin Maquillaje (Love without Makeup) is a mini novela that was shown in 2007. It is a production of Rosy Ocampo, who also produced La Fea Mas Bella. It stars Marlene Favela, Sergio Goyri, Lucía Méndez and Carmen Montejo.  It was a tribute to the 50 years of telenovelas in Mexico.

Synopsis
This is a love story, made in one of the best categories of the telenovelas: the one that evolves parallel to real life. This is the tribute of Televisa in order to commemorate the 50 years of the telenovelas in Mexico and in the world.

Pina is a young woman who returns to live with her mother Lupita and her grandmother Veronica after becoming a widow with a child 4 years of age. She is one of the "maquillistas", makeup artists working for Mexico's television production house Televisa. These women are the daughters and granddaughters of makeup artists who have worked for the production house since the inception of telenovelas.

Cast
 Marlene Favela as Pina
 Sergio Goyri as Hector
 Lucía Méndez as Lupita
 Carmen Montejo as Veronica
 Sabine Moussier as Beatriz
 Enrique Rocha as Rafael
 Joan Sebastian as Alex
 Helena Rojo as Ines
 César Évora as Pedro
 Daniela Romo as Fernanda
 Nora Salinas as Adriana
 Alejandro Ibarra as Valentino
 Alicia Machado as Marina
 Catherine Papile as Claudia
 Gabriela Goldsmith as Elena
 Enrique Rocha as Rafael
 Alma Muriel as judge
 Benjamin Islas as doctor

Special appearances

 Aarón Hernán
 Adriana Roel
 Aida Pierce
 Alejandra Barros
 Alejandra Meyer
 Alejandro Ávila
 Alejandro Ruiz
 Alfonso Iturralde
 Angélica María
 Carla Estrada
 Carlos Bracho
 Cecilia Romo
 Cynthia Klitbo
 Claudio Baez
 Conrado Osorio
 Diana Golden
 Enrique Lizalde
 Eric Guecha
 Erika Buenfil
 Ernesto Laguardia
 Fernando Robles
 Gastón Tuset
 Gerardo Murguía
 Héctor Gómez
 Ignacio López Tarso
 Jacqueline Andere
 Jacqueline Voltaire
 Joaquín Cordero
 José Luis Reséndez
 Juan José Origel
 Juan Verduzco
 Julio Alemán
 Lili Garza
 Lorena Enríquez
 Luis Bayardo
 Luis Couturier
 Mara Patricia Castañeda
 María Rubio
 Otto Sirgo
 Patricia Navidad
 Raquel Garza
 Raúl Padilla "Chóforo"
 Ricardo Blume
 Sharis Cid
 Sherlyn
 Silvia Pinal
 Verónica Castro
 Xavier Marc
 Yadhira Carrillo

References

2007 telenovelas
2007 Mexican television series debuts
2007 Mexican television series endings
Mexican telenovelas
Spanish-language telenovelas
Televisa telenovelas